was a Japanese politician of the Social Democratic Party. He served as a member of the House of Representatives in the Diet (national legislature) from 1990 until 1993. He had previously served on the city council of Kanoya, Kagoshima.

References 

1929 births
2016 deaths
Members of the House of Representatives (Japan)
Politicians from Kagoshima Prefecture
People from Kanoya, Kagoshima
Social Democratic Party (Japan) politicians